Historia may refer to:

 Historia, the local version of the History channel in Spain and Portugal
 Historia (TV channel), a Canadian French language specialty channel
 Historia (newspaper), a French monthly newspaper devoted to History topics
 Historia (video), a compilation video released by Def Leppard
 Historia (Antiquity journal), a peer-reviewed history journal specialised in Greek and Roman Antiquity
 Historia (history of the Americas journal), a peer-reviewed history journal dealing with the history of the Americas
 the Latin word for historiography
 Historia (drama), an unfinished drama of Polish writer Witold Gombrowicz, compiled from the author's notes by Konstanty Jeleński
 Historia Reiss, a fictional character in Japanese manga and anime series Attack on Titan
 Historia (Romanian magazine), history magazine owned by Adevărul

See also

 Historias, by Ricardo Arona

 Herstory, feminism
 History (disambiguation)
 Histories (disambiguation)
 Histoire (disambiguation)